Hélder Bruno Macedo Sousa (born 13 October 1977) is a Portuguese former professional footballer who played as a midfielder.

Club career
Born in Matosinhos, Sousa started his career with amateurs Padroense F.C. in 1997. In his country, in which he competed almost exclusively in the second and third divisions, he also represented C.D. Trofense (two spells), S.C. Braga's reserves, A.D. Ovarense, Gondomar SC, C.D. Feirense and F.C. Vizela. On 15 September 2002, whilst with Braga, he made his only Primeira Liga appearance, which consisted of 20 minutes as a starter in a 2–0 away loss against Varzim SC.

In the summer of 2010, aged nearly 33, Sousa moved abroad for the first time, joining Cypriot club Olympiakos Nicosia. On 10 January 2012 he signed an 18-month contract with fellow First Division team APOEL FC, for a transfer fee of €90,000. He made his official debut six days later, playing 23 minutes in a 0–0 home draw with his former employers.

Sousa made his UEFA Champions League debut on 14 February 2012 at the age of 34, featuring 72 minutes in a 1–0 defeat at Olympique Lyonnais in the round of 16. He added a further two appearances, as the side reached the quarter-finals for the first time ever.

On 29 January 2013, Sousa's contract with APOEL was terminated by mutual consent. The following day, he returned to his homeland and signed for two years with former club Trofense.

Sousa played well into his 40s, always in lower-league or amateur football.

References

External links
APOEL official profile

1977 births
Living people
Sportspeople from Matosinhos
Portuguese footballers
Association football midfielders
Primeira Liga players
Liga Portugal 2 players
Segunda Divisão players
Padroense F.C. players
C.D. Trofense players
S.C. Braga B players
S.C. Braga players
A.D. Ovarense players
Gondomar S.C. players
C.D. Feirense players
F.C. Vizela players
F.C. Pedras Rubras players
Merelinense F.C. players
Cypriot First Division players
Olympiakos Nicosia players
APOEL FC players
Portuguese expatriate footballers
Expatriate footballers in Cyprus
Portuguese expatriate sportspeople in Cyprus